The Governing Mayor of Berlin is the head of government, presiding over the Berlin Senate. As Berlin is an independent city as well as one of the constituent States of Germany (Bundesländer), the office is the equivalent of the Ministers President of the other German states, except the states of Hamburg and Bremen, where the heads of government are called "First Mayor" and "President of the Senate and Mayor", respectively. The title Governing Mayor of Berlin is the equivalent of Lord Mayor in the meaning of an actual executive leader.

According to the Berlin Constitution, the Governing Mayor is member and head of the Berlin Senate. The ministers are called senators. The two deputies additionally hold the title of Mayor (historically: burgomaster). The title Mayor is also held by the heads of the twelve boroughs of Berlin, although they do not actually preside over self-governmental municipalities.

The Governing Mayor is elected by the city's state parliament, the Abgeordnetenhaus of Berlin (equivalent to the  Landtag of other federal states), which also controls their policy guidelines and is able to enforce resignation by a motion of no confidence. The Governing Mayor is entitled to appoint and release the senators of the government.

The seat of the Senate is the city hall, Rotes Rathaus, in Mitte.

History
As capital of the Kingdom of Prussia, Berlin received its first Lord Mayor (Oberbürgermeister) according to the Prussian reforms after the retreat of the Napoleonic occupation troops in 1809, approved by King Frederick William III. He served as head of the city council  called Magistrat. The two-stage administration and the office of the boroughs' mayors were implemented in the course of the wide-ranging incorporations by the 1920 Greater Berlin Act.
 

During the Allied occupation after World War II, the city assembly (Stadtverordnetenversammlung) elected the Social Democratic politician Ernst Reuter as Lord Mayor on 24 June 1947, who, however, did not obtain the affirmation by the Allied Kommandatura of Berlin due to Soviet reservations. Following the Communist putsch in Berlin's city government in September 1948, a separate city parliament (still named Stadtverordnetenversammlung von Groß-Berlin) was set up, however, de facto only competent for the western occupation sectors of what was to become West Berlin was elected on 5 December 1948, electing two days later a separate city government and Ernst Reuter Lord Mayor for West Berlin. The Soviet administration had officially deposed the previous elected government for all of Berlin with effect only in the eastern sector and had installed the SED Lord Mayor Friedrich Ebert, Jr. in East Berlin already on 30 November 1948.

West Berlin introduced its own constitution (Verfassung von Berlin), accounting for the changed facts, with effect of 1 October 1950. This constitution provided for the renaming of the city parliament to "Abgeordnetenhaus von Berlin", of the city government into "Senate of Berlin" and the head of government into "Governing Mayor of Berlin". Following the new constitution representatives were elected on 3 December 1950 and the new parliament re-elected Ernst Reuter as head of city government on 18 January 1951, with Reuter then adopting the new title. From 1951 to 1990, during the Cold War, the Governing Mayor was the head of government in West Berlin with his seat at Rathaus Schöneberg, while East Berlin de jure remained under Soviet occupation and de facto became a part and capital of the East Germany — not recognized by the NATO members, but actually condoned by the 1971 Four Power Agreement on Berlin and the German Basic Treaty of 1972.

The government of West Berlin claimed to be the legitimate government for all of Berlin within the borders established by the 1920 Greater Berlin Act until the Peaceful Revolution of 1989. Even before German reunification on 3 October 1990, the West Berlin Governing Mayor and the East Berlin Oberbürgermeister held common cabinet meetings, until Berlin-wide elections took place on 2 December 1990.

The following list of mayors of Berlin shows all the mayors (Oberbürgermeister, Regierender Bürgermeister) of Berlin, Germany since 1809:

List 

 Governing Mayor of Berlin (1951–present) 
Political party:

See also
Politics of Berlin
History of Berlin
Timeline of Berlin
List of people from Berlin
List of mayors of Berlin

Notes and references

External links

Governing Mayor of Berlin